Hoveyzeh County (Arabic:مقاطعة الحويزة) is in Khuzestan province, Iran. The capital of the county is the city of Hoveyzeh. At the 2006 census, the region's population (as Hoveyzeh District of Dasht-e Azadegan County) was 30,750 in 5,417 households. It was separated from Dasht-e Azadegan County 2008. The following census in 2011 counted 34,312 people in the newly formed Hoveyzeh County, in 7,600 households. At the 2016 census, the county's population was 38,886 in 9,449 households.

Hoveyzeh is considered among the famous counties of Iran because of the Iran-Iraq War. It is located near the border of Iraq and its citizens are considered among Khuzestani Arab people.

Administrative divisions

The population history and structural changes of Hoveyzeh County's administrative divisions over three consecutive censuses are shown in the following table. The latest census shows two districts, four rural districts, and two cities.

References

 

Counties of Khuzestan Province